RWD domain-containing protein 2B is a protein that in humans is encoded by the RWDD2B gene.

References

Further reading

External links